A legacy game is a variant of tabletop board games in which the game itself is designed, through various mechanics, to change permanently over the course of a series of sessions.

History 
Game designer Rob Daviau claims to have come up with the idea at a work meeting after jokingly asking why the murderous characters in Clue are always invited back to dinner. Realizing that each new game resets, Daviau thought about what it would be like if everyone would remember who the murderer was, and he pitched the idea of a Clue legacy game to Hasbro. While that idea was rejected, Daviau was later asked to use the mechanic in a new version of Risk. Risk Legacy was released in 2011 and was his first game to use this format.

Daviau followed up with an award-winning Pandemic variant, Pandemic Legacy: Season 1, which was released in 2015 to positive reviews and praised as a leap forward in modern board game design. Daviau continues to develop legacy games and co-developed a mechanic, the Echo System, to retain permanent changes through subsequent games in a franchise.

Daviau cited his work on Betrayal at House on the Hill (which was later adapted into a legacy version) and Trivial Pursuit: DVD – Lord of the Rings Trilogy Edition as predecessors to the legacy idea. The latter was designed in such a way that pre-programmed games sorted the cards by difficulty. This caused some vocal backlash as the game was perceived by many to have a more definite end than other versions.

Common mechanics and themes 
Legacy games are designed to be played over the course of a campaign, usually with the same players, and permanently change over time. As such they have been compared to tabletop role-playing games like Dungeons & Dragons. New rules can be introduced as the campaign goes on, allowing for the game to expand both mechanically and thematically. Games can use the expanding campaign as a mode of storytelling; Pandemic Legacy: Season 1 uses a three-act structure to tell its story. Daviau describes legacy games as "experiential" in contrast to traditional games, which are "repeatable". He compared his legacy games to that of a concert where you "buy a ticket for an experience" while Haoran Un of Kotaku describes the idea as "avant-garde performance art".

Legacy games break certain covenants that players expect from traditional board games. Permanent, physical changes can occur to components based on game outcomes and player choices. For instance players might be instructed to write names on cards, place stickers on the game board, or destroy some components. This causes each copy of the game to be unique at the end and has earned the legacy genre criticism in that there is a finite amount of replayability. Some games have been designed to be replayable with refill packs or non-permanent stickers while others are still playable with the final permanent changes once the campaign is over.

List of legacy and legacy-styled games

References

External links 
 Legacy 'family' page at BoardGameGeek
 Keynote by Rob Daviau on legacy games from the Game Developers Conference 2017